Dimitrovgrad Municipality (Bulgarian: Община Димитровград) is a municipality in Haskovo Province, Bulgaria. The administrative centre is Dimitrovgrad.

Settlements 
The municipality consists of two towns (Dimitrovgrad and Merichleri) and 25 villages:

Demography

Religion 
According to the latest Bulgarian census of 2011, the religious composition, among those who answered the optional question on religious identification, was the following:

References 

Municipalities in Haskovo Province